Hoher Ziegspitz is a 1864 m high peak of the Ammergau Alps mountain range in Bavaria, Germany.

Mountains of Bavaria
Ammergau Alps
Mountains of the Alps